Dimitri Bascou (born 20 July 1987) is a French track and field athlete who specialises in the 110 metres hurdles. He is known for his explosive and fast starts. He won the gold medal at the 2016 European Championships and the bronze medal at the 2016 Summer Olympics.

Career
He was the silver medallist at the 2009 Mediterranean Games and came fourth at the 2010 European Athletics Championships.

He improved his indoor best in the 60 metres hurdles at the BW-Bank Meeting in February 2011, coming second with time of 7.53 seconds. He broke Ladji Doucouré's long-standing French record in the 60 m hurdles with a run of 7.41 seconds at the 2016 ISTAF Indoor.

International competitions

Notes

References

External links
 
 
 
 
 
 
 

1987 births
Living people
People from Schœlcher
Martiniquais athletes
French male hurdlers
Olympic male hurdlers
Olympic athletes of France
Olympic bronze medalists for France
Olympic bronze medalists in athletics (track and field)
Athletes (track and field) at the 2012 Summer Olympics
Athletes (track and field) at the 2016 Summer Olympics
Medalists at the 2016 Summer Olympics
Mediterranean Games silver medalists for France
Mediterranean Games medalists in athletics
Athletes (track and field) at the 2009 Mediterranean Games
Athletes (track and field) at the 2013 Mediterranean Games
World Athletics Championships athletes for France
European Athletics Championships medalists
French people of Martiniquais descent
20th-century French people
21st-century French people